Rădoiești is a commune in Teleorman County, Muntenia, Romania. It is composed of three villages: Cetatea, Rădoiești-Deal and Rădoiești-Vale (the commune center).

References

Communes in Teleorman County
Localities in Muntenia